2018 Russian National Women's Freestyle Wrestling Championships (also known as the Russian Women's Nationals 2018) was the national ranking tournament for the Russian international wrestling squad for the year of 2018, it was held in Smolensk, Russia from 10 August - 13 August.  This event was held in the 1150th Anniversary Palace of Sport.

Medal overview

Medal table

Women's freestyle

References

2018 in women's sport wrestling
2018 in Russian women's sport
2018 in sport wrestling
Russian National Freestyle Wrestling Championships
Sport in Smolensk
August 2018 sports events in Russia